Laetesia egregia is a species of sheet weaver found in Western Australia. It was described by Simon in 1908.

References

Linyphiidae
Arthropods of Western Australia
Spiders of Australia
Spiders described in 1908